The 1947 Stanley Cup Finals was a best-of-seven series between the Toronto Maple Leafs and the defending champion Montreal Canadiens. The Maple Leafs won the series four games to two. This was the first all-Canadian Finals since , when the since-folded Montreal Maroons defeated the Maple Leafs.

Paths to the Finals
Montreal defeated the Boston Bruins 4–1 to advance to the Finals. Toronto defeated the Detroit Red Wings 4–1 to advance to the Finals.

The Montreal Canadiens finished first in the league with 78 points. The Toronto Maple Leafs finished second with 72 points. This was the fifth playoff series between these two teams with each team winning two of the previous series. Their most recent series came in the 1945 semifinals which Toronto won in six games. In the regular season series, there were five wins for Montreal, three wins for Toronto and four ties.

Game summaries
Ted Kennedy was the leader with three goals including the Cup winner. Toronto had several new players in its lineup, including Howie Meeker, Bill Barilko and Bill Ezinicki, as Toronto sported the youngest NHL team to win the Cup to that time.

The series continued a competition that had gone on all season, with Montreal and Toronto finishing 1–2. Montreal coach Dick Irvin was mad at the beginning of the series, recalling a season-ending injury to Montreal forward Elmer Lach from a body check by Don Metz. Montreal started out strong in the series, defeating the Leafs 6–0 in the opener. Canadiens goaltender Bill Durnan reportedly asked "How did those guys get in the league?", although he denied saying those words later.

The second game was a rough game, with Maurice Richard knocking out Vic Lynn and Bill Ezinicki with high-sticks to the head. Richard earned himself over 20 minutes in penalties and a game misconduct and a suspension for game three. The Leafs took advantage of the power plays and defeated Montreal 4–0. Richard would earn himself a further $250 fine imposed by president Clarence Campbell.

Games three and four were played in Toronto, and Toronto won both to take a 3–1 series lead. Returning to the Forum for game five, Montreal won the game to extend the series. In the sixth game, Turk Broda showed outstanding goaltending, holding off Ken Reardon on a late breakaway, and the Leafs won 2–1 to win the Stanley Cup.

After the sixth game ended, the Cup was not presented to the Leafs. Clarence Campbell declined to present the Cup immediately, concerned over the spectre of fan violence.

Stanley Cup engraving
The 1947 Stanley Cup was presented to Maple Leafs captain Syl Apps by NHL President Clarence Campbell following the Maple Leafs 2–1 win over the Canadiens in game six.

The following Maple Leafs players and staff had their names engraved on the Stanley Cup

1946–47 Toronto Maple Leafs

See also
 1946–47 NHL season

References and notes

 
 
 

Stanley Cup
Stanley Cup Finals
Montreal Canadiens games
Toronto Maple Leafs games
Stanley Cup Finals
Stanley Cup Finals
Ice hockey competitions in Toronto
Ice hockey competitions in Montreal
Stanley Cup Final, 1947
Stanley Cup Final, 1947
Stanley Cup Finals
Stanley Cup Finals